Cortifen, also known as cortiphen or kortifen, as well as fencoron, is a synthetic glucocorticoid corticosteroid and cytostatic antineoplastic agent which was developed in Russia for potential treatment of tumors. It is a hydrophobic chlorphenacyl nitrogen mustard ester of 11-deoxycortisol (cortodoxone).

See also
 List of hormonal cytostatic antineoplastic agents
 List of corticosteroid esters

References

Acetate esters
Tertiary alcohols
Amines
Corticosteroid esters
Glucocorticoids
Ketones
Mineralocorticoids
Nitrogen mustards
Organochlorides
Prodrugs
Russian drugs
Chloroethyl compounds